Evelyn Agnes Pepper CStJ  RRC (3 March 1905 – 2 April 1998) was a Canadian nurse and nursing sister, named as a Commander of the Order of St John. She was awarded the Florence Nightingale Medal and was made Honorary President of the Nursing Sisters Association of Canada

Life 
Pepper was born in Ottawa, Ontario and graduated from Ottawa Civic Hospital in 1928 before attending McGill University. She served as a Nursing Sister for the Royal Canadian Army Medical Corps in England, Italy, the Netherlands and France during World War II.  She received the Royal Red Cross (RRC) in 1945 for her service as a nurse in WWII.

She was awarded the Order of Canada in 1996 for her "outstanding example of dedication, professionalism and responsibility," as well as her leadership, contributions to health care, and disaster emergency planning. Pepper died in her native Ottawa in 1998, aged 93. She never married.

References

Sources
Guly, Christopher. Globe and Mail (Toronto), 4 June 1998, page A20

1905 births
1998 deaths
Canadian military nurses
Canadian women nurses
Commanders of the Order of St John
McGill University alumni
Members of the Order of Canada
People from Ottawa
Canadian women in World War II
World War II nurses
Florence Nightingale Medal recipients